Canotia holacantha, also known as crucifixion thorn or simply canotia, is a flowering shrub / small tree in the family Celastraceae. It is the only species in the genus Canotia.

Distribution
The plant is native to the higher elevation deserts of the Southwestern United States in Arizona and southeastern California, and of Northwest Mexico in isolated locales in Baja California and Sonora).

Canotia grows in desert scrub environments, primarily on slopes or in washes. It is found in the higher Sonoran Desert across central Arizona, reaching to the Mojave Desert of California and northwest Arizona, and into the lower reaches of the Grand Canyon.

Prehistory
The prehistoric distribution of Canotia holacantha has been analyzed with pollen records in certain locations. One of the most detailed studies has been conducted in the Waterman Mountains of Arizona, where C. holacantha has been documented to have occurred during the Late Wisconsin glacial period, along with dominant trees Juniperus osteosperma and Pinus monophylla.

Description
However, one specimen located in the eastern Mojave Desert near Wikieup, Arizona is known to exceed  in height. It is usually a scrubby species, with gray-green branches tipped with sharp thorns.

This species handles photosynthesis with its twigs, rather than the short-lived leaves, like the unrelated Foothill palo verde (Parkinsonia microphylla) which it closely resembles.   Its leaves are insignificant scales which are quickly shed and rarely seen; more easily seen are its seed pods, which are persistent clusters of reddish-brown seed capsules which hang in groups of five.

Vernacular names
Other common names for this species include chaparro amargosa, corona-de-cristo, and rosario; all such names are in reference to its thorny twigs, which are likened to the Crown of Thorns. The name "crucifixion thorn" is also applied to several unrelated species, some of which canotia shares its range with, including Castela emoryi in the family Simaroubaceae and Koeberlinia spinosa (allthorn) in the family Koeberliniaceae.

The World War II Ailanthus-class net laying ship USS Canotia (AN-47) was named after this tree.

Canotia is grown in cultivation by seeds.

References

External links
 Arizona Wildflowers: Crucifixion thorn – Canotia holacantha
Ironwood Forest National Monument: Desert Tropicals, Crucifixion thorn)
Desert Tropicals: Canotia holacantha
NAZFlora – Canotia holacantha

North American desert flora
Flora of the Southwestern United States
Flora of Northwestern Mexico
Flora of the California desert regions
Monotypic rosid genera
Celastrales genera
Celastraceae
Flora without expected TNC conservation status